Proclamation of the Republic may refer to:
Proclamation of the Irish Republic, issued during the Easter Rising of 1916
Proclamation of the Republic (Brazil), celebrated by a public holiday on November 15